Qviding FIF is a Swedish football club located in Gothenburg. The club was formed October 1987 following a merger of the BK Qviding and Fräntorps IF clubs.  Qviding FIF is currently playing in Division 1 Södra.

In recent years the club has had 4 seasons in the  Superettan. Qviding FIF are affiliated to the Göteborgs Fotbollförbund.

Valhalla IP has been their home ground since 2008, having previously played at Torpavallen.

Season to season

Attendances

In recent seasons Qviding FIF have had the following average attendances:

Current squad

Achievements

League
 Division 1 Södra:
 Winners (1): 2007
 Runners-up (1): 2010

External links
Qviding FIF – official site
Torpa E20 – supporter site

Footnotes

Association football clubs established in 1987
Football clubs in Gothenburg
Football clubs in Västra Götaland County
1987 establishments in Sweden